Sean Cassidy is an illustrator and artist.

Sean or Shaun Cassidy may also refer to:

Shaun Cassidy, singer
Shaun Cassidy (album), his 1976 debut album
Sean Cassidy (Fair City character)
Banshee (comics), the Marvel Comics superhero